Total Blackout is an American game show airing on Syfy that features contestants that have to complete challenges such as: identifying things with either their hands, nose, or mouth; gathering items; or getting from point A to Point B while being totally in the dark (hence the name "Total Blackout"). The host of the show is Jaleel White, known for roles like Steve Urkel on the ABC/CBS sitcom Family Matters, and Sonic the Hedgehog in three animated shows. Each episode has four players competing to win $5,000. On occasion, episodes will feature four teams of two. The player or team who either takes the longest to do a certain task or identifies the fewest items in the allowed time is eliminated at the end of each round. The show was renewed for a second season by SyFy that started on October 30, 2012. Season 1 and 2 are now available on iTunes.

The show is originally Danish and first aired in Denmark (created by Henrik Nielsen) on Kanal 5 in 2011, where Uffe Holm was host of the show. The show was later adapted to a U.S.version.

Episodes

Season 1 (2012)

Season 2 (2013)

References

External links 
 Official Website (via Internet Archive)

2010s American comedy game shows
2012 American television series debuts
2013 American television series endings
Syfy original programming